Roberto de Oliveira (born September 11, 1955) is a former American soccer player who played for the Detroit Express in the North American Soccer League.

Career statistics

Club

Notes

References

1955 births
Living people
American soccer players
Association football forwards
Cleveland Cobras players
New York Cosmos players
Detroit Express players
Los Angeles Aztecs players
American Soccer League (1933–1983) players
North American Soccer League (1968–1984) players